Eskişehir Zoo is an animal park in Eskişehir, Turkey.

It is in Tepebaşı ilçe (district). It was opened in April 2017 by the Metropolitan municipality of Eskişehir after two-year construction. It is sponsored by the Eskişehir-based Eti company. There are two closed areas, one reserved for the aquarium, so called Undersea worldand the other is a house of birds, reptiles, amphibians and arthropoda from the warm regions. Most of the land animals have their yards protected either by fences with low voltage electricity or glass panels. In total there are 243 species 123 of which are in aquarium. The zoo is open to the public everyday except Mondays.

Gallery

References

Zoos in Turkey
Visitor attractions in Eskişehir.
Zoos established in 2017
2017 establishments in Turkey
Tepebaşı District